The Times At The Astradome is a compilation album by West London Post punk and Indie band The Times released in 1992.<ref name="Discogs.com">[http://www.discogs.com/Times-At-The-Astradome-Lunaville/release/1028538 The Times on Discogs.com]</ref>

Track listing
Side A - Performance AWellCome - 01:08Septieme Ciel - 04:34Big Painting - 04:03On The Peace Line - 04:24Valvaline - 04:17Crashed On You - 04:42
Side B - Performance BAll Your Life - 04:21No Love On Haight St. - 03:11Love And Truth - 04:03Shoom - 07:22Manchester - 02:48Cloud Over Liverpool'' - 04:03

Personnel
The Shed (bass)
Paul Mulreany (drums)
Paul Heeren (guitar)
Jan Stevens (vocals)
Edward Ball (vocals, guitar, acoustic guitar)

References

The Times (band) albums
1992 albums